The FIS Ski Flying World Championships is a ski flying event organised by the International Ski Federation and held every two years. Unlike ordinary ski jumping, the Ski Flying World Champion is determined after four jumps. 40 jumpers qualify for the competition and jump the first round, 10 are eliminated, and the 30 remaining jumpers compete in the last three rounds. The person with most points combined after four jumps is declared the World Champion. In 2004, the FIS introduced a team event between national teams of four jumpers, with two jumps each.

Host cities

Championships

Individual

Team

Medal table
After the 2022 championships

See also
Ski flying
Ski jumping
World's longest ski jumps
FIS Nordic World Ski Championships

References

External links
Ski flying World Championship information fis-ski.com

 
Ski jumping competitions
Ski flying
Ski flying
Recurring sporting events established in 1972
International Ski Federation competitions